Terese L. Berceau (born August 23, 1950) is an American politician who served as a Democratic member of the Wisconsin State Assembly from 1999 until 2019.

Berceau was born in Green Bay, Wisconsin and graduated from the Green Bay East High School. She attended the University of Wisconsin-Madison, where she received a Bachelor of Science degree in 1973. She has been a resident of Madison, Wisconsin since 1969.

Prior to being elected to the State Assembly, Berceau served four terms on the Dane County Board of Supervisors from 1992 to 2000, representing the 20th Supervisory District on Madison's west side. She was Vice Chair of the Board from 1996 to 1998.

She also served on the City of Madison Community Development Authority from 1983 to 1992 and was a board member on the Greater Madison Convention and Visitors Bureau and the Monona Terrace Community and Convention Center.

Berceau was elected to represent the 76th Assembly District of Wisconsin in November 1998 after former State Representative Rebecca Young retired. The district number changed when Assembly districts were redrawn in 2011.  The 77th District stretches from nearly Middleton in the north to Monona in the southeast and includes the area of Madison around the University of Wisconsin campus and the Village of Shorewood Hills.  In the 1998 election, Berceau won with 71% of the total 22,603 votes cast, having a majority in all 26 wards. She was re-elected with 68% of the votes case in 2000. In 2002, 2004 and 2006 Berceau ran unopposed.

For the 2017 - 2018 legislative session, Berceau is the ranking Democrat on the Assembly Committees on Colleges and Universities and Consumer Protection and is a member of the Assembly Committees on Insurance, Local Government, Constitution and Ethics and the Joint Committee on Audit. In the 2005-06 session, Berceau introduced twenty-five bills related to reproductive rights, consumer protection, workers' rights, health care reform, the protection of stem cell research and the teaching of evolution.

In February 2018, Berceau announced her retirement from the legislature. In interviews following her announcement, she expressed a need to enter a new stage in her life.

References

External links
Wisconsin Assembly - Representative Terese Berceau official government website
 
 Follow the Money - Terese Berceau
2008 2006 2004 2002 2000 1998 campaign contributions
Campaign 2008 campaign contributions at Wisconsin Democracy Campaign

1950 births
Living people
21st-century American politicians
21st-century American women politicians
Green Bay East High School alumni
University of Wisconsin–Madison alumni
Politicians from Green Bay, Wisconsin
Women state legislators in Wisconsin
Democratic Party members of the Wisconsin State Assembly